John Hirst (born 18 December 1970) is a former professional rugby league footballer who played in the 1980s and 1990s. He played at club level for Stanley Rangers ARLFC, and Wakefield Trinity (Heritage № 1010).

References

1970 births
Living people
English rugby league players
Place of birth missing (living people)
Wakefield Trinity players